Osman Zati Korol (1880; Smyrna (Izmir) - September 21, 1946; ?) was an officer of the Ottoman Army and later a general of the Turkish Army. A native of Smyrna, he participated in the Caucasus campaign against the Russians during World War I. He later led the defence and recapture of Izmir from the Greek Army during the Turkish War of Independence.

See also
List of high-ranking commanders of the Turkish War of Independence

Sources

1880 births
1946 deaths
People from İzmir
Ottoman Imperial School of Military Engineering alumni
Ottoman Military College alumni
Ottoman Army officers
Ottoman military personnel of the Balkan Wars
Ottoman military personnel of World War I
Turkish Army generals
Turkish military personnel of the Greco-Turkish War (1919–1922)
Recipients of the Medal of Independence with Red Ribbon (Turkey)